The sexual abuse scandal in Stockton diocese is a significant episode in the series of Catholic sex abuse cases in the United States and Ireland.

Oliver O'Grady affair
In 1984, a Stockton police investigation into sexual abuse allegations against Oliver O'Grady was reportedly closed after diocesan officials promised to remove the priest from any contact with children. Mahony, under oath, denied knowing of O'Grady's activity despite evidence to the contrary. During one particular line of questioning, Mahony was asked why he claimed not to remember multiple allegations of rape by one of his own subordinates (O'Grady) when he was the Bishop of Stockton. Mahony was advised by his attorney not to answer the question.

Challenging investigations into abuse
In a later matter regarding the Los Angeles Archdiocese, Bishop Roger Mahony appealed an attempt to gain access to church documents relating to sexual abuse all the way to the Supreme Court. The Court refused to hear the appeal, and the decision required the archdiocese to comply with a subpoena from the Los Angeles County District Attorney for letters to the former priests and notes from counseling sessions conducted by the church.

Deliver Us from Evil
The 2006 documentary Deliver Us from Evil is based on accusations that Mahony, while serving as Bishop of the Roman Catholic Diocese of Stockton, knew that Oliver O'Grady, a priest who sexually abused children, including a nine-month-old baby, in a string of Central California towns for 20 years, was a child molester but failed to keep him away from children. In Deliver Us from Evil, O'Grady says Mahony was "very supportive and very compassionate and that another situation had been smoothly handled". Mahony denies knowing that O’Grady was a child molester.  However, the documentary provided copies of letters between Mahony and O'Grady during this time.  The letters also were a subject of discussion in Mahony's deposition in a civil lawsuit related to O'Grady.

See also
Abuse
Child abuse
Child sexual abuse
Religious abuse
Sexual abuse
Sexual misconduct
Spiritual abuse

References

Incidents of violence against boys
Stockton